Jackson Jones Bushnell (February 19, 1815 – March 8, 1873) was an American professor.

Bushnell was born in Old Saybrook, Connecticut, February 19, 1815.

He graduated from Yale College in 1841. He entered Andover Theological Seminary in December 1841, but after a few months there, became a tutor in Western Reserve College, Ohio. After a tutorship of two years, during the latter of which he was licensed to preach, he was appointed financial agent of the college, and served in that relation, and as an agent of the Western College Society, until April 1848. He was then appointed Professor of Mathematics and Natural Philosophy in Beloit College, and entered on his office as the pioneer instructor of the new institution. In 1858 he resigned, and devoted himself to business in Beloit, but in 1863 was re-appointed and continued in office until his death. Besides his proper work as a professor, he was the financier of the college, and its prosperity, as well as the growth of the business interests of the town, is largely due to him.

He died after a week's illness, of typhoid pneumonia, in Beloit, Wisconsin, March 8, 1873.

Bushnell married in 1854 Miss Sarah E. Lewis, of Southington, Connecticut. She survived him, with their three children.

External links
 Bringing a burgeoning Beloit College to life with Jackson Bushnell
 Jackson J. Bushnell, Beloit College archives

1815 births
1873 deaths
Yale College alumni
Andover Newton Theological School alumni
Case Western Reserve University faculty
Beloit College faculty
People from Beloit, Wisconsin
People from Old Saybrook, Connecticut
Businesspeople from Wisconsin
19th-century American businesspeople